The 2016 FIRS World Inline Hockey Championships was the 21st event hosted by the Comité International de Roller In-Line Hockey (CIRILH), an organization and discipline of the Fédération Internationale de Roller Sports (FIRS), held in Asiago and Roana in the Veneto region, Italy, between June 12–25, 2016.

The four competitions were played at two venues, 6 kilometres from each other. The Pala Hodegart, which seats 2,200, is located in Asiago. Pala Robaan is located in Roana.

23 teams competed in the senior men's tournament, 17 teams in the senior women's, 18 teams in the junior men's and seven teams in the junior women's. The senior men's tournament began on June 20, 2016, and the senior women's tournament began on June 12 and concluded on June 17 (same as junior men's).

Medal summary

Medal table

Medalists

Senior Men's tournament

Participating nations

Senior Women's tournament

Junior Men's tournament

Junior Women's tournament

See also 
 FIRS Inline Hockey World Championships
 List of FIRS Senior Men's Inline Hockey World Championships medalists

References

External links

Inline hockey tournaments
International sports competitions hosted by Italy